Blyth is a village and civil parish in the Bassetlaw district of the county of Nottinghamshire, in the East Midlands, north west of East Retford, on the River Ryton. The population of the civil parish as of the 2011 census is 1,233. It sits at a junction with the A1, and the end of the motorway section from Doncaster.

Geography
The village is situated on the A1 at the southern end of the fifteen-mile A1(M) Doncaster bypass, which opened in 1961. The Blyth roundabout was replaced in March 2008 by a grade separated junction (junction 34). The Moto Blyth Services are also at this junction. The £320,000 (equivalent to £ in ), 1½ mile A614 Blyth Bypass was built at the same time as the Nottinghamshire section of the Doncaster Bypass and opened in 1960. The A614 became the A1 when the Doncaster bypass opened. Also passing through the village is the A634 from Maltby to Barnby Moor. The dual-carriageway £964,000 (equivalent to £ in ), five-mile section of the A1 from Chequer House (Ranby) to Blyth opened in August 1966. The former A614 road through the town is now the A634 and B6045.

History

Blyth Priory

The priory church of St. Mary and St. Martin is one of the oldest examples of Norman architecture in the country. It was part of a Benedictine monastery founded in 1088. This priory was founded by Roger de Builli of Tickhill Castle, one of William the Conqueror's followers.

The founder and later benefactors endowed Blyth with lands, money and churches. It was staffed at first by monks from the Mother House, Holy Trinity Priory at Rouen France. In 1286 Thomas Russel had to be returned to Rouen because of his intolerable conduct and also John de Belleville, as the climate did not suit him. There are other records of the unruly conduct of French monks.

During a visitation of the priory in 1536 it was alleged that five of the monks were guilty of grave offences and it was surrendered. George Dalton, the Prior, received a pension of twenty marks, and this seems to have been the only pension awarded. The net annual income at the date of the surrender was £180. (equivalent to £ in ).

After the Dissolution the east part of the church was demolished and a tower built at the west end of the nave.

See St Mary and St Martin's Church, Blyth for more information.

Blyth Hall
In 1603 Sir Edward Stanhope sold the Blyth estate to Robert Saunderson, of Gilthwaite, Rotherham.

In 1635 the 490-acre estate was sold by the Saunderson family to John Mellish, a London merchant. His son Edward, a merchant in Portugal, returned to England in 1671 and in 1684 commissioned the demolition of the old priory and the building of Blyth Hall immediately north of the church. The hall stood at approximately 53°22'45.39"N 1° 3'48.46"W. He was High Sheriff of Nottinghamshire for 1692–93 and died unmarried in 1703, leaving the property to Joseph Mellish, his cousin's son. It descended in the Mellish family until 1806, when it was sold to Joshua Walker, the son of an ironmaster from Rotherham.

Joshua's son and heir, Henry Frederick Walker (born 1807), was High Sheriff of Nottinghamshire for 1852–53. At the end of the 19th century the hall was bought by Francis Willey, 1st Baron Barnby, a Bradford wool merchant. He was High Sheriff for 1908–09 and was succeeded by his son Vernon Willey, 2nd Baron Barnby, who was the MP for South Bradford.

The hall was demolished in 1972 and the site is now occupied by a housing estate.

On the village green is the former Leper Hospital of St John the Evangelist, said to have been built by the Knights Hospitaller of St. John of Jerusalem. It was refounded in 1226, and was being used as a school in 1695.

See also
Listed buildings in Blyth, Nottinghamshire

References

External links

 Village website
 Doncaster Bypass
 History of St Mary and St Martin church
 New junction

Villages in Nottinghamshire
Civil parishes in Nottinghamshire
Bassetlaw District
Monasteries in Nottinghamshire
1088 establishments in England
1536 disestablishments in England
British country houses destroyed in the 20th century